The Zoo Botanical Park Dois Irmãos, is located in the city of Recife, state of Pernambuco — Brazil. The park has an area of 384.4 ha, 14 of which is dedicated for the Zoo Botanical and a Natural Science Museum, and the remaining area for an Atlantic Forest reserve (considered one of the largest atlantic forest area in the state). This park offers to the visitors the possibility to know about the local ecosystems, plants and wildlife. It has about 650 animals — birds, reptiles and mammals — from more than 120 species. It is the most representative Zoo in the North/Northeast region of Brazil, highlighted by events and pioneers innovative activities in areas such environmental education and breeding animals in captivity. Also in this park, nature knowledge is acquired through experience and direct contact with animals, making the Zoo no longer just a window of animals to become a Nature conservation center. The park was founded in 1916, in the land of engenho Dois Irmãos (which means two brothers), owned by Antonio and Tomas Lins Caldas.

History 
Initially founded as Horto Florestal de Dois Irmãos (Dois Irmãos Forest Garden) in 1916, the Zoobotanical Garden of Dois Irmãos was created in 1939. Its first director was Vasconcelos Sobrinho, a Brazilian professor, agronomist and ecologist. Transformed into an Ecological Reserve by Law No. 9.989 of January 13, 1989, the garden was renamed Dois Irmãos Park in 1997.

Description

Zoo botanical - 140000 squaremeters (14 ha)
Atlantic Forest reserve - 373.4 ha
Natural Science Museum
Ecological trails (by day or night)

Location

Farias Neves square, Dois Irmaos, CEP52171-011, Recife - Pernambuco
Sunday through Sunday - 8am/4pm

References

Zoos in Brazil
Botanical gardens in Brazil
Nature reserves
Buildings and structures in Recife
Protected areas of Pernambuco
1916 establishments in Brazil
Articles needing infobox zoo